Kingman station is an Amtrak train station located in the historic Kingman Railroad Depot in Kingman, Arizona, United States. Amtrak's Southwest Chief trains stop at the Kingman station once daily in each direction.  Kingman is also the transfer point for dedicated, guaranteed Amtrak Thruway Motorcoach service to/from Laughlin, Nevada and Las Vegas, Nevada.

This station has an enclosed waiting room, but is unmanned. There are no ticket agents or Quik-Trak kiosks on site.

Of the eight Arizona stations served by Amtrak (in 2020), Kingman was the third-busiest in fiscal year 2020, boarding or detraining 5,536 passengers in 2020.

History 
The Atchison, Topeka and Santa Fe Railway (ATSF) built the depot in 1907. The station has been a contributing property to the Kingman Commercial Historic District, which has been on the National Register of Historic Places since 1986. Like many depots constructed by the ATSF, the building exhibits characteristics of the Spanish Colonial Revival style of architecture, particularly in the roofline's curvilinear gables. In early 2011, the city of Kingman finished a multi-year restoration of the depot. The work was funded in part through a $471,500 federal Transportation Enhancements grant and approximately $150,000 in federal Community Development Block Grants. Following the rehabilitation, the depot houses a passenger waiting room and a railroad museum.

The depot is the third station in Kingman, and is built of poured concrete.  The first station was destroyed by fire, as was the 1901-built "fire proof" one, which burned to the ground in 1906.

It is served by Amtrak's Southwest Chief's  route from Chicago, Illinois, to Los Angeles, California, with one eastbound and one westbound stop daily.

See also
Kingman Santa Fe Depot, Kingman, Kansas

References

External links

 Kingman Amtrak Station (USA RailGuide – TrainWeb)
 Kingman, Arizona Tourism

Amtrak stations in Arizona
Atchison, Topeka and Santa Fe Railway stations in Arizona
Buildings and structures on U.S. Route 66
Transportation in Mohave County, Arizona
Historic district contributing properties in Arizona
Railway stations in the United States opened in 1907
National Register of Historic Places in Kingman, Arizona
Railway stations on the National Register of Historic Places in Arizona